Joseph J. Higgins (October 12, 1929 – July 20, 2007) was an American politician who served in the New Jersey General Assembly from 1966 to 1974.

Born in Elizabeth, Higgins played prep baseball at St. Patrick's High School. He graduated from Seton Hall University and earned a law degree from Georgetown University Law Center after completing military service in the United States Navy during the Korean War. He died on July 20, 2007, in Fort Lauderdale, Florida at age 77.

References

1929 births
2007 deaths
American military personnel of the Korean War
Democratic Party members of the New Jersey General Assembly
New Jersey lawyers
Politicians from Elizabeth, New Jersey
20th-century American politicians
Georgetown University Law Center alumni
Seton Hall University alumni
The Patrick School alumni